Distributed environment may refer to:
Distributed computing, about the computer science field of distributed computing
Distributed computing environment, about the software system developed in the 1980s